Rosolio is a type of Italian liqueur made from a base of alcohol, sugar, and water in the same proportion, which is flavored by adding an essence of any of various types.

Despite a common misconception based on the name, rosolio has no direct connection with roses or rose petals. (Rose essence is, however, one option for addition to the base; other options include citrus, coffee, aniseed, and mint.) In fact, the name comes from the Latin , which means "dew of the sun": Drosera rotundifolia.

The liqueur is common in Piedmont and in Southern Italy. It enjoys a special popularity in Sicily, where it has been prepared since the sixteenth century and was offered to house guests as a sign of good luck.

Сharacterization 
It is widespread above all in Piedmont, Campania, Sicily and particularly in Umbria. In Italy it has been used since ancient times to offer to guests and in confectionery preparations. The oldest is the Franciscan rosolio prepared in the Assisi area with rose petals. On the Sicilian island, where since the sixteenth century it was produced at home and offered to guests as a sign of good luck, various recipes of rosolio were tested, including those with citrus fruits, coffee, anise, mint, cinnamon and pistachio.

Zingarelli's Vocabulary of the Italian Language (Vocabolario della Lingua Italiana) defines rosolio as “liqueur prepared with alcohol, sugar and water in the same proportion, plus an essence that gives it its name”: therefore, rose rosolio, mint rosolio, etc. The etymology that he attributes to it is that of ros solis; that is, dew of sunshine. Drosera and rosolida come from the Greek meaning covered with dew, in fact the sundews seem to be covered with dew. With Drosera rotundifolia L. the pharmacopoeia made an elixir called ros solis, originally from Dalmatia. The word ros solis developed into rosolio, interpreted as a liqueur made with roses. Consequently, the petals of roses are of little use in defining the name. 

In Ficarra, in the province of Messina, a particular recipe recommended preparing it by keeping alcohol (to which the peel of three oranges macerated for forty days and vanilla had been previously added) and a syrup made simply with sugar and water. 

Concerto liqueur is a type of rosolio produced on the Amalfi Coast, precisely in the city of Tramonti.

See also
 Italicus (liqueur)
 List of liqueurs

References 

Italian liqueurs